Wimbledon Cricket Club is a cricket club who play in the Surrey Championship Premier League. The club was formed in 1854 and play their home games at Wimbledon Cricket Club Ground. They have won the Surrey Championship on 11 occasions and the ECB National Club Twenty20 twice.

References

English club cricket teams
Cricket clubs established in 1854
Cricket in Surrey
1854 establishments in England